Richard Townsend may refer to:

Richard Townsend (soldier) (c. 1618–1692), English soldier, Irish MP for Baltimore
Richard Townsend (mathematician) (1821–1884), Irish mathematician, author, and academic
Richard Townsend (sportsman) (1886–1960), Australian rules footballer and cricketer
Richard Townsend (politician) (c. 1731–1783), Irish MP for Cork County and Dingle 1776
Richard Boyle Townsend (1756–1826), Irish MP for Dingle 1782–1795
Richard Townsend (sailor) (born 1929), Canadian sailor
Richard Townsend (cricketer) (1829–1852), English cricketer

See also
Richard W. Townshend (1840–1889), U.S. Representative from Illinois